, prov. designation: , is a trans-Neptunian object, located in the circumstellar disc of the Kuiper belt in the outermost region of the Solar System. It was discovered on 7 November 2002, by American astronomer Marc Buie at the Kitt Peak Observatory near Tucson, Arizona. The object has not been named yet.

Orbit and classification 

 is a plutino, a population of objects in the Kuiper belt that stay in a 2:3 resonance with Neptune. A large part of the inner Kuiper belt is formed by objects belonging to this population which is named after its largest member, Pluto.  orbits the Sun at a distance of 30.9–47.1 AU once every 243 years and 9 months (89,021 days; semi-major axis of 39.02 AU). Its orbit has an eccentricity of 0.21 and an inclination of 1° with respect to the ecliptic. The body's observation arc begins with its official discovery observation on 7 November 2002. It is currently approaching the Sun at 39.428 AU, with its perihelion-passage projected to occur in June 2076.

Numbering and naming 

This minor planet was numbered by the Minor Planet Center on 10 December 2011. , it has not been named. If named, it will follow the already established scheme of naming these objects after mythological entities associated with the underworld.

Physical characteristics

Diameter and albedo 
Observations with Herschels PACS instrument were published in 2011.

References

External links 
 Orbit simulation from NASA JPL site
 List Of Centaurs and Scattered-Disk Objects, Minor Planet Center
 (307463) 2002 VU130, Small Bodies Data Ferret
 

307463
Discoveries by Marc Buie
20021107